The 1991–92 Serbian Hockey League season was the first season of the league after the Yugoslav Ice Hockey League was dissolved after the 1990–91 season. KHK Crvena Zvezda won the inaugural Serbian Championship.

External links
Serbian Ice Hockey Association

Serbian Hockey League
Serbian Hockey League seasons
Serb